Nonlinear pricing is a broad term that covers any kind of price structure in which there is a nonlinear relationship between price and the quantity of goods. An example is affine pricing.
A nonlinear price schedule is a menu of different-sized bundles at different prices, from which the consumer makes his selection. In such schedules, the larger bundle generally sells for a higher total price but a lower per-unit price than a smaller bundle.

References and links 
Definition on About.com

Walter Nicholson, Christopher Snyder - Microeconomic Theory: Basic Principles and Extensions, Eleventh Edition

See also
Two part tariff
Second degree price discrimination

Pricing